|}

The Fairy Bridge Stakes is a Group 3 flat horse race in Ireland open to thoroughbred fillies and mares aged three years or older. It is run at Tipperary over a distance of 7 furlongs and 100 yards (1,500 metres), and it is scheduled to take place each year in August.

The event is named after Fairy Bridge, the dam of the successful sire Sadler's Wells. It was established in 2003, and it was initially classed at Listed level.

The Fairy Bridge Stakes was promoted to Group 3 status in 2012.

Records
Most successful horse (2 wins):
 Tested - 2014, 2015

Leading jockey (3 wins):
 Kevin Manning – Modeeroch (2006), Anna's Rock (2007), Lady Wingshot (2012)
 Pat Smullen - Tested (2014, 2015), Tanaza (2016)
 Declan McDonogh -  Plume Rouge (2003), Choose Me (2009), Agartha (2022) 

Leading trainer (3 wins):
 Kevin Prendergast – Plume Rouge (2003), Queen of Palms (2004), Choose Me (2009)
 Jim Bolger – Modeeroch (2006), Anna's Rock (2007), Lady Wingshot (2012)
 Dermot Weld - Tested (2014, 2015), Tanaza (2016)

Winners

See also
 Horse racing in Ireland
 List of Irish flat horse races

References

 Racing Post:

 pedigreequery.com – Fairy Bridge Stakes – Tipperary.
 horseracingintfed.com International Federation of Horseracing Authorities - Fairy Bridge Stakes (2018)

Flat races in Ireland
Mile category horse races for fillies and mares
Recurring sporting events established in 2003
Tipperary Racecourse
2003 establishments in Ireland